Creepers is a video game developed by Canadian studio Destiny Software Productions for MS-DOS and published by Psygnosis in 1993.

Gameplay

Reception
Scott A. May for Compute! said "Creepers plays well, but it lacks the zest and individuality needed to stand out in this popular genre."

David S. Moskowitz for VideoGames & Computer Entertainment said "Creepers is just as enjoyable and addictive as one would expect from Psygnosis [...] computer-puzzle fans have very little to complain about."

Ken Hill for Computer Gaming World said "All in all, Creepers is a disappointment. Something about the whole premise just doesn't work; the ideas here just aren't as fresh as they were in the original Lemmings."

Reviews
PC Player (Germany) - Mar, 1993
Tilt - Feb, 1993
PC Games (Germany) - Apr, 1993
ASM (Aktueller Software Markt) - Apr, 1993

References

1993 video games
DOS games
DOS-only games
Psygnosis games
Puzzle video games
Real-time strategy video games
Video games about insects
Video games developed in Canada